Yonaka (stylised as YONAKA) are an English rock band based out of Brighton. The group consists of Theresa Jarvis on vocals, George Edwards on guitar, Alex Crosby on bass and keyboards, and Robert Mason on drums. Yonaka released their debut album, Don't Wait 'Til Tomorrow, on 31 May 2019.

History

First EPs and Don't Wait 'Til Tomorrow (2014–19)
Yonaka performed on the BBC Introducing stage at Radio 1's Big Weekend 2016 and released their debut EP, Heavy, the following year. 2018 saw the group issue two further EPs, Teach Me to Fight and Creature. The title track from Creature reached the top spot of the Kerrang! Rock Chart in December 2018.

In autumn 2018, the band went on a European tour with Bring Me the Horizon and Fever 333 and in October 2018, they played a four-track session at the BBC Maida Vale studios, during which they presented a live mashup of the songs "Jumpsuit" and "Paparazzi".

"Teach Me to Fight" was used as the official theme song for the WWE pay-per-view event Fastlane in March 2019 and in Fate: The Winx Saga.

In May 2019, Yonaka signed with American label Fueled by Ramen, ahead of the release of their debut album, Don't Wait 'Til Tomorrow, on 31 May. The album reached 38 on the UK Albums Chart and 10 on the UK Vinyl Albums Chart. The band were also nominated for Best British Newcomer at the 2019 Kerrang! Awards.

In December 2019, they featured on Bring Me the Horizon's song "Tapes", which appeared on their EP Music to Listen To....

Seize the Power (2020–present)
In a session made in July 2020 for Amazon Music UK's Twitch channel, which was later deleted a month after the broadcast, Yonaka performed for the first time an unreleased song called "Ordinary".

On 27 January 2021, the band released "Seize the Power", the first official single from their mixtape of the same name. On the track, Yonaka commented: "It's been so long since we released new music and the time has finally come; this is a new chapter for us. We want you to get lost in a feeling of strength and empowerment when listening to this song". The mixtape was released on 15 July 2021 and featured appearances from Fever 333 and Barns Courtney. Yonaka are scheduled to appear on Palaye Royale's 2023 Fever Dream European + UK tour to support Seize the Power.

Discography

Studio albums

EPs

Mixtapes

Singles

 Note that the single "Ignorance" has been reworked, becoming "Awake" (included on the album Don't Wait 'Til Tomorrow).

Other appearances

Music videos

Notes

References

Musical groups established in 2014
English rock music groups
2014 establishments in England
Female-fronted musical groups